Cool TV is a Hungarian television channel owned by RTL Group. It was launched as m+ on 15 September 2003, but a year later, it was relaunched as Cool TV on 4 September 2004.

History

2003–2010
Originally Cool TV had the target audience of urban 15–29-year-olds who love music, externals, clothes, trendy lifestyle and extravagance. The channel was first launched as m+ on 15 September 2003, but a year later, it was relaunched as Cool TV on 4 September 2004, so the channel could be available in 2.5 million households.

The channel broadcast 24 hours a day and aired reruns of series that RTL Klub originally purchased or produced as well as series targeting today's youth. In 2005, the channel has relocated on paper to Romania.

In 2007, Cool TV launched a series of topical shows produced by the channel, such as Cool Live and Cool Night, featuring younger hosts lent to Cool by RTL Klub; the former being a youth lifestyle show, and the latter being an adult show including interviews with Hungarian porn stars and producers, as well as occasionally showing soft-core porn video clips. These talkshows have now been cancelled.

In 2009, Cool TV purchased the airing rights of the successful Hungarian version of Whose line is it anyway?, Beugró.

The channel broadcast 24 hours a day and aired reruns of series that RTL Klub originally purchased or produced, as well as series targeting today's youth. These included: South Park, Married... with Children (Egy rém rendes család), 24, Footballer's Wives (Futbalista feleségek), The L Word (L), Queer as Folk (A fiúk a klubból), The Unit (Az egység), Dead Like Me (Haláli hullák), Weeds (Spangli), Skins (Skins), Desperate Housewives (Született feleségek)

2010–present
From 30 August 2010, Cool TV changed image and was rebranded, aiming for a wider audience. Since then, the channel airs mostly crime procedurals. The move was successful because as of July 2012 Cool TV is the third most watched commercial TV channel, and most watched cable channel in Hungary (target audience 18–49, prime time 19.00-23.00) beating main competitor Viasat 3.

Programming

Series
 Alarm für Cobra 11 – Die Autobahnpolizei
 Bones
 Cold Case
 CSI: Miami
 CSI: New York
 Criminal Minds
 God Friended Me
 Gilmore Girls
 Just For Laughs Gags
 Magnum P.I.
 Medicopter 117 – Jedes Leben zählt
 Stumptown
 The Good Doctor
 The Mentalist
 Whiskey Cavalier
 Without a Trace

Logos

References

External links
 

Television in Hungary
RTL Group
Television networks in Hungary
Television channels and stations established in 2003
Television channels and stations established in 2004
2003 establishments in Hungary
2004 establishments in Hungary
Mass media in Budapest